Tyler Jordan Magloire (born 21 December 1998) is an English professional footballer who plays as a defender for Northampton Town.

Career

Blackburn Rovers
Magloire made his Rovers academy debut in the 2014–15 season. He progressed through the Academy system and into the development squad.

On 12 March 2019, Magloire started in the first team and helped keep a clean sheet in the Football League Championship 3–0 victory against Wigan Athletic.

On 8 August 2019, Magloire joined Rochdale on loan until the end of the season. On 29 January, he was recalled by Blackburn.

On 6 November 2020, Magloire signed for National League side Hartlepool United on a loan until January 2021.

On 2 February 2021, it was confirmed that Magloire had joined Scottish Premiership side Motherwell on loan until the end of the season.

Northampton Town
On 18 January 2022, Magloire joined League Two side Northampton Town on loan until the end of the season.

On 28 July 2022, Magloire returned to Northampton Town for an undisclosed fee, signing a three-year contract.

Career statistics

References

External links

1998 births
Living people
Black British sportspeople
Footballers from Bradford
English footballers
Association football defenders
Blackburn Rovers F.C. players
Rochdale A.F.C. players
Hartlepool United F.C. players
Motherwell F.C. players
Northampton Town F.C. players
English Football League players
National League (English football) players
Scottish Professional Football League players